Sadegh Tirafkan (July 3, 1965 in Karbala, Iraq to Iranian parents – May 9, 2013 in Toronto, Ontario, Canada) was an Iranian contemporary artist who lived mainly in Tehran, Iran.

Career
Tirafkan employed different media in his work: photography, video installation, and collage. He graduated from Tehran University with a degree in Photography in 1989 and participated in solo and group exhibitions worldwide.

Tirafkan's work included "Manhood", which dealt with the perception of masculinity in Persian culture. Other projects such as "Persepolis", "Ashoura", "Secret of Words", "Iranian Man", "Whispers of the East", "The Loss of Our Identity", "Multitude" and "Devotion" dealt with Iranian history, identity, sociopolitical, religious and gender issues.

His works are in the collections of several museums including the Tehran Museum of Contemporary Art, British Museum, Brooklyn Museum and the Los Angeles County Museum of Art.

Group Exhibition
 1986 Ketabe Azad Gallery, Tehran, Iran.

Personal Exhibitions
 1989 Mansoureh Hossini Gallery, Tehran Iran
 1991 Seyhoun Art Gallery, Tehran, Iran
 1995 Seyhoun Art Gallery, Tehran, Iran
 1997 Seyhoun Art Gallery, Tehran, Iran
 2000 Seyhoun Art Gallery, Tehran, Iran
 2001 Seyhoun Art Gallery, Tehran, Iran
 2002 Massoud Nader Gallery, New York City, United States
 2002 Parkerson Gallery, Houston, United States
 2003 VU Gallery, Paris, France
 2004 Lehmann maupin Gallery, New York City, United States
 2005 Assar Art gallery, Tehran, Iran
 2005 Espace photography Contreype, Brussels, Belgium
 2005 VU Photography Centre, Quebec City, Canada
 2006 Aspace Gallery, Toronto, Canada
 2006 Lee Ka-Sing gallery, Toronto, Canada
 2006 Massoud Nader Gallery, New York City, United States
 2007 Silk Road Gallery, Tehran, Iran
 2008 Assar Art gallery, Tehran, Iran
 2010 Selma Feriani + Louise Alexander Gallery, London, UK

Works
 1997 Persopolis, Video installation
 2000 The Children of Dark city, Installation & video, Painting, Sculpture
 2000 Iranian Man, Photographic series
 2001 Ashura, Installation pictures, video & painting
 2002 Secret of Words, Photographic series
 2002 Stages, Photo, Video installation
 2003 Sacrifice, Photographic series
 2005 Lighting The Nation Gate, Photo, Video installation
 2006-7 Whispers of the East, Photographic series
 2009-2010 Human Tapestry, Photographic series

Public collection
 2001, Museum of Contemporary Art, Tehran, Iran
 2003, Maison européenne de la photographie, Paris, France
 2007, British Museum, London, UK
 2008, Brooklyn Museum, New York City, United States
 2008, Los Angeles County Museum of Art, Los Angeles, United States

See also
 Culture of Iran
 Islamic art
 Iranian art
 Iranian art and architecture
 List of Iranian artists

References

External links
CV/Images
Official website
France 24 TV Interview
NY Times Article "Habitats - Home and Album", 03/04/2010
NY Times Article "Iran Inside Out", Chelsea Art Museum, 24/07/2009
NY Times Article "Art in Review - Loop and layered", 03/07/2009
NY Times Article "What Would Sappho Say?", 20/01/2004

See also
Iranian cinema
Iranian modern and contemporary art

Iranian film directors
Iranian contemporary artists
Iranian photographers
People from Karbala
1965 births
2013 deaths